Warwick railway station serves the town of Warwick in Warwickshire, England.  The station is served by Chiltern Railways (who manage the station), and also less frequently by West Midlands Trains. It is located around half a mile north of the town centre.

Warwick is also served by Warwick Parkway railway station on the town's outskirts, which opened in 2000.

History
Warwick station was opened on 1 October 1852 by the Great Western Railway on their main line between London, Oxford and Birmingham. The station's platforms were extended in length in the 1890s. The station formerly had an additional bay platform on the western side, which in steam days was often used to hold the bank engine used to assist heavy goods trains up Hatton Bank towards Birmingham. The original buildings on the 'up' (London bound) platform were demolished in 1964.

Platforms and facilities
The main station building is on the Birmingham bound Platform 1, a subway links this to the London bound Platform 2, which has only a basic shelter.

The station is equipped with real-time electronic information departure boards, A staffed ticket office is open for part of the day; there is also a self-service ticket machine located outside the station building, which is on the northbound platform. There is an indoor waiting room by Platform 1 and two outside waiting shelters, one on each platform. There was a 'Permit-to-Travel' machine on the northbound platform but was removed in 2016. In 2012 a cafe selling drinks and snacks opened on Platform, but has since closed. Although car parking is available at the station it is limited and there is a charge for it. A local taxi company called Castle Cabs shares the main station building with Chiltern Railways. The station underwent a light refurbishment in 2022 including repainting and the replacement of signage to correspond with Chilterns' new branding.
The station will receive lift instalment works in 2023 to fit with the governments Access For All scheme.

Services
At peak times, these are augmented by a few West Midlands Trains services between Leamington Spa and / or Worcester Shrub Hill. Chiltern also run a limited weekday peak through service between Marylebone & Kidderminster that stops here.

Gallery

References

External links

Photographs of Warwick railway station from Warwickshire Railways
Rail Around Birmingham and the West Midlands: Warwick station

Railway stations in Warwickshire
DfT Category D stations
Former Great Western Railway stations
Railway stations in Great Britain opened in 1852
Railway stations served by Chiltern Railways
Railway stations served by West Midlands Trains
1852 establishments in England
Warwick